Village Park may refer to:
 Village Park, Florida
 Village Park, Hawaii
 Village Park (stadium), a football stadium in Alofi, Niue